Dandepalle or Dandepally is a village in Elkathurthy mandal, Hanamkonda district (formerly Warangal Urban district), in the Indian state of Telangana. Prior to the creation of Telangana in 2014, the village was a part of Karimnagar district, Andhra Pradesh.

References 

Villages in Hanamkonda district
Mandals in Hanamkonda district